Louis Dufort (born July 29, 1970) is a Canadian composer of electroacoustic music. He was born and lives in Montréal, Canada.

Dufort has a bachelor's degree in electroacoustic music composition from the Université de Montréal as well as a master's degree from the Conservatoire de musique du Québec à Montréal, where he received a first prize with distinction. But university studies have not altered his iconoclasm and originality: his passion for electronic music and his love of cinema, painting and contemporary dance lead him to incorporate elements in his composition that are drawn from beyond music.

He currently divides his time between composing for the Marie Chouinard contemporary dance company (he composed the music for the choreography of Le cri du monde, which premiered in Toronto on March 21, 2000), his work with the artistic committee of ACREQ, and the creation of hybrid and unbridled musical experimentation.

His works have been presented in Montréal and in Europe, especially in France. In 1996 he won the First Jury Prize at the fifth Concours international électro-vidéo clip organized by ACREQ for his work entitled Vulvatron 2000 (1994). In 1997, he received First Prize from the SOCAN Foundation for Concept 2018957 (1995) and was a finalist at the Concours international Noroit-Léonce Petitot in Arras, France.

Recordings
 Matériaux Composés (empreintes DIGITALes, IMED 0893, 2008)
 Montreal Sound Matter (Pogus, 21041-2 CD, 2006)
 L'orchestre de granulation with L'Orchestre de granulation (No Type (web), NT 086, 2006)
 Connexion (empreintes DIGITALes, IMED 0051, 2000)

List of works
 Accident (2001), soprano saxophone, and processing
 L'archange (2005), oper'installation: 3 voices, 1 actor, and tape
 Body_Remix (2005)
 Cantique #1 (2003), videomusic
 Cantique #2 (2003), videomusic
 Les cerisiers (2003)
 Chorale (2003)
 Concept 2018957 (1995)
 Consomption (1999), soprano, and tape
 Le cri du monde (2000)
 Décap (2000)
 Déflagration (2002)
 Ephem (2004)
 La femme des sables (2002)
 Grain de sable (2005)
 Hi_Res (2005), surround 8.1
 Hi_Res.1 (2005), surround 10.1
 [improvisation] (2003)
 Intonarumori (2002), harbour symphony
 Lucie (1998)
 Manu militari (2003), saxophone quartet, and processing
 Matériau III (2007)
 Matério_* (2006)
 Miniatures (2006), string quartet, and processing
 Mouvement (2005)
 L'orchestre de granulation
 Particules (2006), amplified piano, processing, and video
 Pointe-aux-Trembles (1996)
 Silo mon amour (2000)
 Sound Object (2003), videomusic
 Spiel (2001), flûte et traitement
 Transit (1998)
 Trip à six (2003)
 Vulvatron 2000 (1994)
 Zénith (1999)

External links
 Dufort's personal site

Sources
 http://www.electrocd.com/en/bio/dufort_lo/

1970 births
Living people
Electroacoustic music composers
Canadian composers
Canadian male composers
Conservatoire de musique du Québec à Montréal alumni
Université de Montréal alumni